Mellen may refer to:

 Mellen Township, Michigan
 Mellen, Wisconsin
 Joey Mellen, author of the book Bore Hole
 Ida Mellen (1877–1970), American ichthyologist and biologist

See also 
 Mellin
 Mellon (disambiguation)
 Melon (disambiguation)